Akramabad-e Kianpur (also Romanized as Akramābād-e Kīānpūr) is a village in Akhtarabad Rural District, in the Central District of Malard County, Tehran Province, Iran. At the 2006 census, its population was 59, in 19 families.

References 

Populated places in Malard County